Calophyllum hirasimum is a species of flowering plant in the Calophyllaceae family. It is found only in West Papua in Indonesia.

References

hirasimum
Flora of Western New Guinea
Data deficient plants
Taxonomy articles created by Polbot